Mount Kennett is a distinctive snow and rock mountain,  high, between Quartermain Glacier and Fricker Glacier on the east side of Graham Land.
 Features on this coast were photographed by several American expeditions: United States Antarctic Service, 1939–41; Ronne Antarctic Research Expedition, 1947–48; U.S. Navy photos, 1968. The mountain was mapped by the Falkland Islands Dependencies Survey, 1947–48, and named by the UK Antarctic Place-Names Committee for Peter Kennett, General Assistant with the British Antarctic Survey Larsen Ice Shelf party, 1963–64.

References

Mountains of Graham Land
Foyn Coast
North American expeditions